

Players

Competitions

Division Three

League table

Results summary

League position by match

Matches

FA Cup

Coca-Cola Cup

Auto Windscreens Shield

Appearances and goals

References

Books

1995-96
Northampton Town
Northampton Town